Garrett G. Fagan (13 January 1963 - 11 March 2017) was an Irish American historian and writer known for his research in the various areas of Roman history, as well as his critique of pseudoarchaeology. He was Professor of Ancient History at Penn State University.

Published books
The Topography of Violence in the Greco-Roman World, with W. Riess. (University of Michigan Press, 2016)
The Lure of the Arena: Social Psychology and the Crowd at the Roman Games (Cambridge University Press, 2011)
New Perspectives on Ancient Warfare (History of Warfare, Volume 59), with Matthew Trundle (Brill, 2010)
Archaeological Fantasies: How Pseudoarchaeology Misrepresents the Past and Misleads the Public (Routledge, 2006)
From Augustus to Nero: An Intermediate Latin Reader (Cambridge University Press, 2006)
Bathing in Public in the Roman World (University of Michigan Press, 1999)

References

Further reading
 
 

1963 births
2017 deaths
American historians
American skeptics
Pennsylvania State University faculty
Writers from Dublin (city)
Irish emigrants to the United States